Baroness Chapman may refer to:

 Nicky Chapman, Baroness Chapman of Leeds (1961–2009)
 Jenny Chapman, Baroness Chapman of Darlington (born 1973)

Noble titles created in 2004